The DeRosay-McNamee House is an historic house at 50 Mt. Vernon Street in Cambridge, Massachusetts.  It is a -story brick house, with a dormered hip roof and limestone trim.  Its main facade exhibits high-quality Colonial Revival styling, with a symmetrical appearance that includes rounded bays flanking the main entry, and an entrance porch supported by clusters of distinctively turned columns.  It was built c. 1895-6 by the principal owner of a local brickyard, who pioneered modernizations allowing for the year-round manufacture of bricks.

The house was listed on the National Register of Historic Places in 1990.

See also
National Register of Historic Places listings in Cambridge, Massachusetts

References

Houses completed in 1895
Houses on the National Register of Historic Places in Cambridge, Massachusetts